Teja Paku Alam (born 14 September 1994) is an Indonesian professional footballer who plays as a goalkeeper for Liga 1 club Persib Bandung.

Career statistics

Club

Honours

Club
 Sriwijaya U-21
 Indonesia Super League U-21: 2012–13
 Sriwijaya FC
 Indonesia President's Cup 3rd place: 2018
 East Kalimantan Governor Cup: 2018

International
Indonesia
AFF Championship runner-up: 2016

Individual
 Liga 1 Player of the Month: January 2022
 Liga 1 Team of the Season: 2021–22
 APPI Indonesian Football Award Best Goalkepper: 2021–22
 APPI Indonesian Football Award Best 11: 2021–22
Persib Bandung Player of the Year 2021–22

References

External links 
 
 Teja Paku Alam at Liga Indonesia

1994 births
Living people
Indonesian footballers
People from Pesisir Selatan Regency
Sportspeople from West Sumatra
Liga 1 (Indonesia) players
Sriwijaya F.C. players
Semen Padang F.C. players
Persib Bandung players
Association football goalkeepers